Omicron Epsilon Pi is a non-collegiate American sorority and the first Greek letter organization catering to the needs of lesbian women with an emphasis on lesbians of color.

See also
List of LGBT and LGBT-friendly fraternities and sororities

References

External links 
National Website
My Space page

LGBT fraternities and sororities
Lesbian organizations in the United States
2000 establishments in Florida
Organizations for LGBT people of color
Organizations for women of color
Student organizations established in 2000
LGBT in Florida